Joel Michael "Mike" Mendel (September 24, 1964 – September 22, 2019) was an American television producer. He was a five-time Emmy Award winner for his work on The Simpsons and Rick and Morty.

Career
Mendel first worked in television as a production assistant on All My Children and Loving during his summer breaks from studies at Syracuse University. After graduating Syracuse with a Bachelor of Science in television and film production, he worked with James L. Brooks and Gracie Films on Broadcast News, Big, and The Tracey Ullman Show. When Tracey Ullmans The Simpsons shorts were spun off into their own series, Mendel joined its staff as the show's producer, serving from season 1 to season 10. For his work on The Simpsons, Mendel won three Primetime Emmy Awards for Outstanding Animated Program in 1995 ("Lisa's Wedding"), 1997 ("Homer's Phobia"), and 1998 ("Trash of the Titans").

After departing The Simpsons, Mendel produced shows such as The PJs, The Oblongs, Drawn Together, Sit Down, Shut Up, and Napoleon Dynamite. In 2013, he joined Rick and Morty, where he won his fourth Emmy Award for the episode "Pickle Rick" in 2018. He won a posthumous Emmy in 2020 for the episode "The Vat of Acid Episode".

Personal life
Mendel attended Monroe-Woodbury High School in Central Valley, New York. A resident of Studio City, Los Angeles, he was married to Juel Bestrop, a casting director for the series Brooklyn Nine-Nine and Life in Pieces, and had two children.

Mendel died at his home in Los Angeles on September 22, 2019, from natural causes, two days before his 55th birthday. His death has been described as "unexpected".

Legacy
Tributes were made to him by Justin Roiland and Al Jean. "The Winter of Our Monetized Content", the 31st season premiere of The Simpsons, was dedicated to his memory, as was the 4th season premiere and the entirety of Season 6 of Rick and Morty, as well as the pilot episode of Solar Opposites.

Filmography

Television

Film

References

External links

1964 births
2019 deaths
American animated film producers
Place of birth missing
Television producers from New York (state)
Television producers from California
Syracuse University alumni
Emmy Award winners